David Bright (born 5 September 1972) is an English former footballer who played in the Football League for Stoke City.

Career
Bright was born in Bristol but was signed by Stoke City in the late 1980s. He made just one professional appearance, as a substitute against Reading in November 1990. He later played for Swedish club Strömsnäsbruk IF and Newcastle Town.

Career statistics

References

English footballers
Stoke City F.C. players
English Football League players
1972 births
Living people
Newcastle Town F.C. players
Association football forwards